Antonio Cifariello (19 May 1930 – 12 December 1968) was an Italian actor and documentarist.

Life and career 
Born in Naples, son of the sculptor Filippo Cifariello, Antonio started his career in 1950 as the main actor, credited as Fabio Montale, in La sposa che vestiva di bianco, a film which had several production issues and that was released only in 1953. In the meanwhile Cifariello appeared in several fotoromanzi using the stage name Mauro Vellani, and enrolled at the Centro Sperimentale di Cinematografia in Rome, graduating in 1953. The same year, he was chosen by Federico Fellini to star in Marriage Agency, a segment of the anthology film Love in the City. Following the release of the film, in a short time Cifariello established himself as one of the most requested young actors in Italian cinema, mainly active in romantic comedies and adventure films. Tired of playing stereotypal characters of seducers or boyfriends, in the 1960s Cifariello gradually moved his career towards journalism and television documentaries. On December 12, 1968, during a trip to Zambia for a RAI documentary, Cifariello died in a plane crash. He was 38.

Partial filmography

 They Were Three Hundred (1952) - Sergente Cafiero
 Woman of the Red Sea (1953) - Pierluigi
 Amanti senza peccato (1953) - Righetto
 Love in the City (1953) - Giornalista (segment "Agenzia matrimoniale, Un'")
 It Happened in the Park (1953) - The Sailor
 Angels of Darkness (1954)
 Neapolitan Carousel (1954) - Don Armando
 Le signorine dello 04 (1955) - Amleto
 Le ragazze di San Frediano (1955) - Andrea Sernesi aka Bob
 The Belle of Rome (1955) - Otello
 Scandal in Sorrento (1955) - Nicola Pascazio 'Nicolino'
 I quattro del getto tonante (1955) - Tenente Luciano Zanchi
 The Awakening (1956) - Peppino
 Peccato di castità (1956)
 Noi siamo le colonne (1956) - Ugo Stefani
 Operazione notte (1957)
 La donna del giorno (1957) - Giorgio Salustri
 Souvenir d'Italie (1957) - Gino
 Vacanze a Ischia (1957) - Antonio
 La mina (1958) - Stefano
 Young Husbands (1958) - Ettore Graziani
 The Adventures of Nicholas Nickleby (1958, TV Series) - Nicola Nickleby
 Resurrection (1958) - Chenbeck
 The Beautiful Legs of Sabrina (1958) - Teo
 L'amore nasce a Roma (1958) - Mario
 Promesse di marinaio (1958) - Mario
 Men and Noblemen (1959) - Mario Ludovici
 Ciao, ciao bambina! (1959) - Riccardo Branca
 Wild Cats on the Beach (1959) - Gino Santoni
 Vacations in Majorca (1959) - Ernesto
 Roulotte e roulette (1959) - Antonio Aiello
 Questo amore ai confini del mondo (1960) - Walter
 A Qualcuna Piace Calvo (1960) - Alberto Rossi
 Rome 1585 (1961) - Leonetto Ardenghi
 My Love Is Called Margarita (1961) - Eduardo Heredia, profesor de literatura
 Jessica (1962) - Gianni Crupi
 The Lovely Lola (1962) - Javier
 In Search of the Castaways (1962) - Chief Thalcave
 Giuseppe w Warszawie (1964) - Giuseppe Santucci (final film role)

References

External links 
 

1930 births
1968 deaths
20th-century Italian male actors
Italian male film actors
Italian male television actors
Male actors from Naples
Italian documentary filmmakers
Victims of aviation accidents or incidents in Zambia
Centro Sperimentale di Cinematografia alumni